Jordan Insurance Company is an insurance company in Jordan.  JIC offers the following insurance:
Marine insurance
Motor insurance
Life insurance
Casualty insurance
Health insurance
Property insurance

Supplementary products include the "Sehtak Kanz" discount card, and a roadside assistance program.

The company is listed on the Amman Stock Exchange's ASE Weighted Index with the symbol "JIC".  10% of the company's stock is owned by Munich Re, a reinsurance company in Germany.

External links
Jordan Insurance Company 

Companies based in Amman
Financial services companies established in 1951
Jordanian brands
Insurance companies of Jordan
1951 establishments in Jordan
Companies listed on the Amman Stock Exchange